The Hardivillers-Breteuil narrow gauge railway was a  gauge industrial railway, approximately  long, in the north of France. It ran from the phosphate quarries and factory at Hardivillers along the Rue de Creveceur (D 930) to a loading ramp called Quai des Phosphates at the railway station in Breteuil.

Railway operation 
In the quarries, horses were mainly used to haul the V-skip trucks for transporting the extracted minerals to the ore washing plant and phosphate factory. The four wheel Corpet steam locomotive N°356/1882 was used, among others, on the approximately 4 km long, mostly straight line to the station. It has been delivered to its first owner M. d'Angicourt on 25 November 1881 under the name Secondat and came to the Établissements P. LINET in Breteuil in 1927. There was also the Corpet-Louvet steam locomotive N° 956/1903, delivered on 12 June 1903 under the name of Mireille to the entrepreneur Gardet in Brest, which also came to the Établissements  P. LINET in 1927.

Quarries 
There were several quarries in the area between Hardivillers and Breteuil. Phosphate mining was carried out from about 1887 to 1972 in open pits and deep mine tunnels, in the chalk fields of the Plateau Picard. Since the closure, pioneer vegetation has been able to develop there and recolonise the spoil heaps. Since the pioneer phase, the scree slopes and chalk cliffs have been overgrown with hawkweed oxtongue and carline thistle, and cutleaf chamomander and lesser butter and eggs (linaria supina) grow on the chalk scree slopes. In older, replanted areas, mahaleb cherry, golden rain and viburnum bushes grow. A beech forest with bluebells eventually develops on the loamy plateaus.

Phosphate factory 
The Société des Établissements P. LINET operated a phosphate factory in Hardivillers. It advertised that the organic nitrogen in P. LINET's compound fertilisers was particularly well absorbed by the plants, pointing out that incorrectly mixed fertilisers led to irregular results. Thanks to the production methods used in Hardivillers, there had been nothing of the sort with P. LINET's compound fertilisers. According to the company, phosphates for agriculture (phosphate chalk from the department of Oise) had the same fertilising effect as phosphates from the department of Somme.

Onward transport 
For marketing, the phosphates were loaded on the Quai des Phosphates near the railway station onto standard-gauge goods trains.

Geology 

Around 1892, it was scientifically proven that the phosphate chalk of Hardivillers is on a geologically higher level than that of Doullens, because the fossils found in it are different.

References 

Railway lines in Grand Est
600 mm gauge railways in France